Valzhyna Mort (born Valhyna Martynava, 1981, Minsk, Belarus) is a Belarusian poet who now lives in the United States.

Life
Her first book of poetry, I'm as Thin as Your Eyelashes, came out in Belarus in 2005. In 2004, she received a Crystal Vilencia Award for best poetry performance in Slovenia. In 2005, she was the recipient of a Gaude Polonia scholarship in Poland, and in 2006, the recipient of a writing fellowship from Literarisches Colloquium Berlin, Germany.

Her first American publication, Factory of Tears (Copper Canyon Press, 2008), the first Belarusian/English poetry published in the U.S., was co-translated from the Belarusian by Elizabeth Oehlkers  Wright and Pulitzer Prize-winning poet Franz Wright. The poems juxtapose youthful coming-of-age to the struggles of a nation's emergent vitality. Collected Body (Copper Canyon Press, 2011) is her most recent book of poetry and her first collection of poems composed entirely in English.

Mort studied at the State University of Linguistics in Minsk. She received her Master of Fine Arts in Creative Writing from American University. Known throughout Europe for her live performances, Mort works explicitly to reestablish a clear identity for Belarus and its language. Mort is the youngest poet to be featured on the cover of Poets & Writers magazine.

In 2009, she appeared at the Poetry International Festival in Rotterdam.

In 2021 she won the Griffin Poetry Prize in the international category, for Music for the Dead and Resurrected.

Selected works

Poetry
I’m as Thin as Your Eyelashes, (2005)
Favourites for accordion, Translator Franz Wright, 2006
Factory of Tears, Copper Canyon Press, 2008, 
Collected Body, Copper Canyon Press, 2011, 
Music for the Dead and Resurrected, Farrar, Straus and Giroux, 2020,

Anthologies

Ilya Kaminsky, Susan Harris (eds), The Ecco Anthology of International Poetry, HarperCollins, 2009, 
Norman Minnick (ed), "Between Water and Song: New Poets for the Twenty-first Century", White Pine Press, 2010,

References

External links
"Poet Valzhyna Mort: An American Debut", Poets & Writers.
Valzhyna Mort at Blue Flower Arts.

21st-century Belarusian poets
Living people
1981 births
Belarusian women poets
21st-century women writers